Radhey Shyam Jaisawal is an Indian politician and was member of the 16th Legislative Assembly in India. He represented the Sitapur constituency of Uttar Pradesh from Oct 1996 till March 2017 and is a member of the Samajwadi Party political party.

Early life and education
Radhey Shyam Jaisawal was born in Sitapur district. He attended  the Raja Raghuver Dayal Inter College and is educated till eighth grade degree.

Political career
Radhey Shyam Jaisawal has been a MLA for four terms. He represented the Sitapur constituency and is a member of the Samajwadi Party political party.

Posts held

See also

 Sitapur (Assembly constituency)
 Sixteenth Legislative Assembly of Uttar Pradesh
 Uttar Pradesh Legislative Assembly

References 

1952 births
Living people
People from Sitapur district
Samajwadi Party politicians
Uttar Pradesh MLAs 1997–2002
Uttar Pradesh MLAs 2002–2007
Uttar Pradesh MLAs 2007–2012
Uttar Pradesh MLAs 2012–2017
Uttar Pradesh politicians